Oberdorf or Oberdorff may refer to:

Places

Austria 
 Oberdorf am Hochegg, a municipality in the district of Feldbach in Styria
 Oberdorf im Burgenland, a town in the district of Oberwart in Burgenland

France 
 Oberdorf, Haut-Rhin, a commune in the Haut-Rhin department in Alsace
 Oberdorf-Spachbach, a community in the Bas-Rhin department in Alsace
 Oberdorff, a commune in the Moselle department in Lorraine

Germany 
 Oberdorf, the historic name for the town of Marktoberdorf, Bavaria
 Oberdorf am Ipf, a suburb of the city of Bopfingen in Baden-Württemberg

Switzerland 
 Oberdorf, Basel-Landschaft, a municipality  in the Basel-Landschaft canton
 Oberdorf, Nidwalden, a municipality in the Nidwalden canton
 Oberdorf, Solothurn, a municipality in the Solothurn canton
 Oberdorf (Zürich), part of the old town in the city of Zürich

See also 
 Oberndorf (disambiguation)
 Oberstdorf